The 1909–10 season was the 37th season of competitive football in Scotland and the 20th season of the Scottish Football League.

Overview

Celtic extended their record run of consecutive league titles to six, while Dundee were Scottish Cup winners for the first time. On the international front, Scotland were outright British champions for the first time in eight years.

League competitions

Scottish League Division One 

Champions: Celtic

Scottish League Division Two

Scottish Cup

Scottish Cup Final

Replay

Second Replay

Other honours

Cup honours

National

County

Highland League

Other senior honours

Carrie Cup: Dundee Hibernian
Central League: Bo'ness
Midland League: competition unfinished
North Eastern Cup: Heart of Midlothian
Northern League: Dundee 'A'
Scottish Union: Dumbarton Harp
Wemyss Cup: Dunfermline Athletic

Scotland national team

Scotland were winners of the 1910 British Home Championship.

Key:
 (H) = Home match
 (A) = Away match
 BHC = British Home Championship

See also
1909–10 Aberdeen F.C. season

Notes

References

External links
Scottish Football Historical Archive

 
Seasons in Scottish football